The Canterville Ghost is a 1996 family film directed by Sydney Macartney. The mystery, romance, and adventure stars Patrick Stewart and Neve Campbell; it is based on an 1887 Oscar Wilde short story of the same title which was serialized in the magazine The Court and Society Review. This story has been adapted to film and made-for-TV movies several times since the original film of the same name.

Filming was done at Knebworth House in Hertfordshire.

Plot
Hiram Otis comes to England with his wife, daughter and two sons on a research grant; he and his family will live in a castle called Canterville Hall. The Castle is haunted by the ghost of a deceased ancestor, Sir Simon de Canterville, doomed to remain on the estate after the death of his wife. His goal is to send the family packing so he begins a ghostly reign of terror. As is revealed by Lord Canterville (Sir Simon's descendant) and the servants Mr. and Mrs. Umney, numerous people have stayed at Canterville Hall in the last few years and have all been scared away by Sir Simon - the locals start betting on how long the Otis family will stay.

Virginia 'Ginny' Otis, the daughter, discovers a mysterious prophecy in a book about the house's history, and a secret passage in the library that leads to a cell where Sir Simon resides during the day with his raven familiar Gabriel. Initially disliking the house and life in England, Ginny starts to appreciate her new home and becomes attracted to Francis, the young Duke of Cheshire, who has also seen Sir Simon's ghost. Unfortunately, Hiram does not believe in ghosts and accuses Ginny of trying to scare the family so they'll return to America.

Sir Simon becomes infuriated by the family's resilience and is himself scared by a fake ghost that the boys build. Angrily chasing the Otis children, Sir Simon causes Ginny to get into more trouble with her father—who is such a skeptic that he cannot see Sir Simon. Ginny uses the secret passage to return to the cell and ends up befriending him. Later, Francis explains to Ginny that Sir Simon was suspected of murdering his wife, Lady Eleanor, and his fate remains unknown. Sir Simon appears to Ginny and advises her to not let her fears ruin her chances of finding true love. Ginny follows his advice and makes her feelings apparent to Francis.

Hiram, still blaming Ginny for the strange happenings, decides to send Ginny back home to America.  Going to Sir Simon for help, Ginny explains how her father doesn't believe in ghosts (much to the ghost's bemusement). They plot to trick Hiram into believing by performing a scene from Hamlet with Sir Simon as the ghost of Hamlet's father. During the performance, however, Sir Simon becomes distraught and disappears halfway through the scene, with Hiram insisting it was a special effect (although the rest of the family are sure it was a real ghost).

Ginny discovers that the lines of the play brought back sad memories for Sir Simon. He confesses that he drove his wife insane after being tricked into thinking she had been unfaithful and that Lady Eleanor killed herself. Surrendering himself to Eleanor's family for punishment, Sir Simon was locked in the cell to starve and cursed by a witch, who condemned him to haunt the house by night and lament the death of his wife by day. Sir Simon can only rest if he is redeemed and allowed to pass on. Sir Simon reveals that Ginny has already fulfilled part of the prophecy by weeping for him. Next, she must pray for him. Sir Simon takes her through a portal in the fireplace to the "Realm of Darkness" to plead to the Angel of Death on his behalf.

The next morning, Hiram goes to Ginny's bedroom to try to make amends and discovers she isn't there.  Panicking, the family search the house and estate aided by Francis, the Umneys, Lord Canterville and the locals. They find the cloak Ginny was wearing in the library and everyone but Hiram realises that Ginny has been taken away by the ghost.  Hiram starts to hear Ginny's voice in his mind and sees her image in Sir Simon's portrait, causing him to start believing in ghosts. That night, they hear a mysterious noise and rush to the library, where the fireplace opens to reveal Ginny trying to get home from the Realm of Darkness. Her family and Francis rescue her before the portal closes.

Ginny takes the family to Sir Simon's cell and they find his chained skeleton. Gabriel disappears, no longer needed, and they hear the chapel bell (which is broken) ring out. Outside, a dead almond tree comes back to life and blooms, fulfilling the prophecy and confirming that Sir Simon is redeemed.

The family decide to stay at Canterville indefinitely, with the blessing of Lord Canterville (who gives Ginny a ring that once belonged to Lady Eleanor) and have Sir Simon's remains buried in the garden beside Lady Eleanor's. Francis and Ginny visit the grave and Ginny thanks Sir Simon for everything he taught her about life, death and how love is stronger than both. Ghostly voices are heard, implying that Sir Simon has been reunited with his wife and is finally happy.

Cast
 Patrick Stewart - Sir Simon de Canterville (The Ghost)
 Neve Campbell - Virginia 'Ginny' Otis
 Daniel Betts - Francis, Duke of Cheshire
 Cherie Lunghi - Lucille Otis
 Edward Wiley - Hiram (Harry) Otis
 Raymond Pickard - Washington Otis
 Ciarán Fitzgerald - Adam Otis
 Joan Sims - Mrs. Umney
 Donald Sinden - Mr. Umney
 Leslie Phillips - George, Lord Canterville

Awards
 Emmy - 1996 - Outstanding Individual Achievement in Music Composition for a Miniseries or a Special - Ernest Troost
 Family Film Award - 1996 - Best Actor - TV - Patrick Stewart
 Family Film Award - 1996 - Best Actress - TV - Neve Campbell
 Family Film Award - 1996 - Best Television Film - Sydney Macartney
 Family Film Award - 1996 - Outstanding Television Film - Robert Benedetti
 Saturn Award - 1997 - Best Single Genre Television Presentation (nomination)

See also
 List of ghost films

External links
 
 
 
 The Canterville Ghost at Amazon.com
 The Canterville Ghost at Barnes and Noble
 The Canterville Ghost - Review on YouTube
 The Canterville Ghost - Review on Pursued By A Bear
 Patrick Stewart at the Los Angeles Times

American television films
American fantasy comedy films
Films based on The Canterville Ghost
American ghost films
1996 television films
1996 films
Films set in castles
Films shot at Pinewood Studios
1990s fantasy comedy films
1990s English-language films
1990s American films